KCMJ-LP 93.9 FM was a non-profit radio station in Colorado Springs, Colorado whose programming leaned to the political left. With an all volunteer staff, they began as an internet only station before reaching the airways. Its license was cancelled on April 2, 2021, as its owners did not renew the station's license.

The Colorado Media Justice Foundation was created to launch this station. Founder Dennis Apuan had the initial vision. He was joined in the early days by Dave Gardner, Tim Board, and Kris Harty in key positions. Bobby Irwin and Ray Uberecken of Cumulus Media contributed technical support and guidance. Stargazers Theatre & Event Center generously served as the location of the transmitter. After a group with no radio experience and no management expertise took over the station, it fell into disarray, failing to keep a signal on the air, failing to file required non-profit reports with the state of Colorado and the IRS, and failing to renew its FCC license.

References

CMJ-LP
Radio stations established in 2016
2016 establishments in Colorado
CMJ-LP
Radio stations disestablished in 2021
CMJ-LP
2021 disestablishments in Colorado
Defunct radio stations in the United States
Defunct community radio stations in the United States